Alton Bay State Forest is a  protected area in Alton, New Hampshire. It was acquired in 1915. It is bordered to the east by the village of Alton Bay at the south end of Lake Winnipesaukee.

See also

List of New Hampshire state forests

References

New Hampshire state forests
Alton, New Hampshire
Protected areas established in 1915
1915 establishments in New Hampshire